Zheng Xun (born August 21, 1987) is a Chinese former competitive ice dancer and current ice dancing coach. With partner Huang Xintong, he is the 2011 Asian Winter Games champion and a five-time Chinese national champion (2007, 2009, 2011, 2012, and 2014). Their best result at the World Championships was 12th in 2012. In spring 2014, he partnered with Zhao Yue.

Programs

Competitive highlights

With Zhao

With Zheng

Coaching career
As of March 2023, Zheng Xun coaches the following pairs:
 Chen Xizi / Xing Jianing
 Li Xuantong / Wang Xinkang

References

External links

 
 

1987 births
Living people
Chinese male ice dancers
Figure skaters at the 2007 Winter Universiade
Figure skaters at the 2010 Winter Olympics
Figure skaters at the 2014 Winter Olympics
Olympic figure skaters of China
Figure skaters from Harbin
Asian Games medalists in figure skating
Figure skaters at the 2007 Asian Winter Games
Figure skaters at the 2011 Asian Winter Games
Medalists at the 2007 Asian Winter Games
Medalists at the 2011 Asian Winter Games
Asian Games gold medalists for China
Asian Games silver medalists for China
Competitors at the 2009 Winter Universiade